CBKA-FM is a Canadian radio station, broadcasting the CBC Radio One network at 105.9 FM in La Ronge, Saskatchewan.

Local programming
Until 2009, CBKA had a local news bureau serving Northern Saskatchewan, and produced the regional noontime show Keewatin Country, but otherwise aired the same programming as CBK, the Radio One outlet for the more populated southern half of the province. In the CBC's service cutbacks announced in March 2009, the operation in La Ronge was eliminated, making CBKA a full rebroadcaster of CBK.  All programming is now fed from CBK's studios in Regina, though the station remains separately licensed.

Rebroadcasters
CBKA-FM has the following rebroadcasters:

Community-owned rebroadcasters

Notes
On August 10, 2009, the CBC applied to add an FM transmitter at Creighton. The application was approved on October 9, 2009, and will operate on the frequency 93.3 MHz with the callsign CBKA-FM-1.

References

External links
 
 

Bka
Bka
Radio stations established in 1975
1975 establishments in Saskatchewan